Kabakhtapa may refer to:
 Ghabaghtapa, Armenia
 Kabagtepe, Azerbaijan
 Qabaqtəpə, Azerbaijan